Alfred Kramer (born 1965) is a Swiss/Italian jazz drummer.

Biography
Alfred Kramer was born in 1965 in Frauenfeld, Switzerland.  He started playing drums at the age of sixteen after having studied piano for nine years. Since 1986, after moving to Italy, he has been working with musicians like Mal Waldron, Enrico Rava, Scott Hamilton, Pietro Tonolo, Andy McGhee, Enrico Pieranunzi, Paul McCandless, Benny Bailey, Chet Baker, Bob Mintzer, Eddie Daniels, Cedar Walton, Joe Henderson, Steve Lacy, Furio Di Castri, Barre Phillips, Art Lande, Art Farmer, Gianni Basso, Miroslav Vitous and Gil Goldstein. He performed all over Europe and the US and on all major Italian festivals (like Umbria Jazz, Rome, Clusone, etc.) and made a number of worth mentioning records with musicians like Phil Woods, Steve Lacy, Lee Konitz, Joe Lovano and Slide Hampton. He now lives near Florence, Italy, and is working in addition to the drums as a trombone player (four appearances on record) and arranger/conductor as well. He conducted Bansigu Big Band for three years. His jazz drum teaching activity includes various State Conservatories such as Genova, Verona  and Padova.

Discography 

 Le meurtier dans l'ombrage with Lukas Kramer - Ubu, 1984
 D.O.C. with Marcello Tonolo - Splasc(h), 1986
 Soft Landing with Giannantonio De Vincenzo - Splasc(h), 1987
 Where extremes meet with Luca Flores - Splasc(h), 1987
 Quartet with Hilaria Kramer - Unit, 1988
 Space Jazz Trio Vol. II with Enrico Pieranunzi - Yvp, 1988
 Blew with Lee Konitz ed Enrico Pieranunzi - Philology, 1988
 Phil's Mood with Phil Woods ed Enrico Pieranunzi - Philology, 1988
 Keptorchestra - Nord Sound, 1990
 Moonmaids in my garden with Songs of Maybe - Ubu, 1990
 Nomos with Riccardo Zegna e Danila Satragno - Ariston, 1989
 Ci ritorni in mente - dedicato a Lucio Battisti - Gala, 1989
 Slowly with Pietro Tonolo - Splasc(h), 1989
 Felix with Sandro Gibellini- Tirreno, 1990
 Thinking of you with Marco Tamburini - Pentaflowers, 1992
 In between with Bruno Steffen e Heiner Althaus - Brambus, 1992
 Very fool with Massimo Salvagnini e Lee Konitz - High Tide, 1993
 Zoom with Strani Itinerari - New Label/Amnesty International, 1994
 Piku with Mauro Negri - Sentemo, 1994
 Sweet Sixteencon Steve Lacy / Keptorchestra - Caligola, 1994
 Buried Treasurescon Racine Steffen Group- Brambus, 1994
 Dayscon Marcello Tonolo/Music on Poetry- Caligola, 1995
 Tribute To Nino Rotacon GAP Band- Nel Jazz, 1995
 Algonchinacon Claudio Capurro- DDQ, 1995
 Miss Etnacon Joe Lovano / Keptorchestra- Caligola, 1995
 Straight Aheadcon M.Tamburini / Slide Hampton- Ermitage, 1996
 La Banda Disegnata with Sandro Gibellini- Flex, 1996
 Tindi & Altro with M. Tindiglia- Splasc(h), 1997
 Disguise with Pietro Tonolo- Splasc(h), 1997
 Notte di Luna Calante with GAP Band / Lucio Dalla- Idea, 1997
 Seed Journey with M. Tonolo / Music on Poetry- Caligola, 1998
 Sundance with Bebo Ferra - CDPM Lion 1998
 Memories of Louis with Giampaolo Casati - Tring 1998
 Piccolo Walzer with Riccardo Zegna - Egea, 2001
 Now  We Can with Bansigu Big Band – Splas(h), 1999
 Amori Imperfetti with Mario Raia - Egea, 2001
 Live at Siena Jazz with Paolo Birro – Splasc(h), 2002
 Mancini Dry with Massimo Salvagnini – Velut Luna, 2003
 Bansigu Big Band with Lee Konitz – Splasc(h), 2004
 Mr 88 with Gianluca Tagliazucchi Trio feat. Lee Konitz, Splasc(h), 2004
 Piano Kings with Paolo Birro – Azzurra, 2005
 Nuances with Gianluca Tagliazucchi – Splas(h), 2006
 Trufò with Sandro Gibellini – Blue Serge, 2006
 Lennie's Pennies with Pietro Tonolo – Blue Serge, 2006
 Back To Da Capo with Lydian Sound Orchestra – Almar, 2006
 Di Mezzo Il Mare with Egea Orchestra – Egea, 2007
 Canto di Ebano with Gabriele Mirabassi – Egea, 2007
 Un Bacio a Mezzanotte with Paolo Birro – Azzurra 2008
 Changing Walking with Fausto Ferraiuolo – Abeat, 2008
 Scott Hamilton with Scott Hamilton – Kragib, 2009
 Open the Cage with Robert Bonisolo – Almar,2009
 Dedicated to...with Joanna Rimmer – SAM, 2009
 Jazz In The Park with Sandro Gibellini - Kragib, 2009
 20! Bansigu Big Band - Music Center, 2013
 Bean And The Boys with Scott Hamilton - Fonè, 2015
 Ballads for Audiophiles with Scott Hamilton - Fonè, 2017
 Castello Nights with Paolo Birro and Aldo Zunino, Fonè, 2017
 I remember you with Dario Carnovale and Lorenzo Conte, Fonè, 2018

References

Swiss drummers
Swiss male musicians
Male drummers
Jazz drummers
Living people
1965 births
People from Frauenfeld
Male jazz musicians